Craig Hill may refer to:

 Craig Hill (actor) (1926–2014), American film actor
 Craig Hill (comedian), Scottish comedian, TV presenter and actor
 Craig Hill (rugby union) (born 1982), Welsh rugby union player
 Craig Hill (soccer) (born 1987), American soccer player
 Craig Hill (footballer) (born 1991), Northern Irish footballer
 Craig L. Hill (born 1949), American inorganic chemist
 Craig Hill (New York), a mountain located in the Catskill Mountains

See also
 Richard Craig Hill (1934–2012), Canadian automobile racer